Activin receptor type-2B is a protein that in humans is encoded by the ACVR2B gene.  ACVR2B is an activin type 2 receptor.

Function 

Activins are dimeric growth and differentiation factors which belong to the transforming growth factor-beta (TGF-beta) superfamily of structurally related signaling proteins. Activins signal through a heteromeric complex of receptor serine kinases which include at least two type I (I and IB) and two type II (II and IIB) receptors. These receptors are all transmembrane proteins, composed of a ligand-binding extracellular domain with cysteine-rich region, a transmembrane domain, and a cytoplasmic domain with predicted serine/threonine specificity. Type I receptors are essential for signaling; and type II receptors are required for binding ligands and for expression of type I receptors. Type I and II receptors form a stable complex after ligand binding, resulting in phosphorylation of type I receptors by type II receptors. Type II receptors are considered to be constitutively active kinases. This gene encodes activin A type IIB receptor, which displays a 3- to 4-fold higher affinity for the ligand than activin A type II receptor.

Interactions 

ACVR2B has been shown to interact with ACVR1B and SYNJ2BP.

References

External links

Further reading 

 
 
 
 
 
 
 
 
 
 
 
 
 
 
 
 
 

GS domain
TS domain
S/T domain
Human proteins
EC 2.7.11